Jennifer Lopez Presents: Como Ama una Mujer, simply referred to as Como Ama una Mujer, is an American five-part miniseries based on the lyrics from the Jennifer Lopez album of the same name. It aired on the Univision Television Network in the fall of 2007. At the end of each episode, Lopez performs the theme song that inspired that episode. The five episodes were released as a two disc DVD set on December 18, 2007 in the United States.

Cast and characters 
Cast credits and character bios via official press release:

 Leonor Varela portrays Sofia, the main protagonist in the miniseries. She is a famous singer and actress whose rise to superstardom happened overnight. She finds her private life to be constantly under attack by the paparazzi.
 Raúl Méndez portrays Diego, someone from Sofia's past who has plans for her future. 
 Cristián de la Fuente portrays Andres, Sofia's fiance and a soccer superstar.
 Gabriela de la Garza portrays Laura, a socialite and fashion designer. She is Diego's jealous girlfriend.
 Rebecca Jones portrays Barbara, Andres' publicist.
 Rocío Verdejo portrays Adriana, Sofia's envious friend and assistant.
 Martin Altomaro portrays Paco, Diego's friend and confidant.
 Josefo Rodriguez portrays Fernando, Sofia's manager. He offers her wise advice and knows her better than she knows herself.
 Karoll Marquez portrays Nicolas, Sophie's brother.
 Luis Fernando Padilla portrays Felipe, Andres' best friend and soccer teammate.

Episodes 
 Sola – October 30, 2007
 Tú – November 6, 2007
 Por Qué Te Marchas – November 13, 2007
 Como Ama una Mujer – November 20, 2007
 Por Arriesgarnos – November 27, 2007

References

External links
 Jennifer Lopez Presents: Como Ama una Mujer at TVTango.com

Jennifer Lopez
2000s American drama television series
2007 American television series debuts
2007 American television series endings
2000s American television miniseries
Univision original programming